Anthidium thomsoni is a species of bee in the family Megachilidae, the leaf-cutter, carder, or mason bees.

Synonyms
Synonyms for this species include:
Anthidium thomsonii Dalla Torre, 1896, emend

References

thomsoni
Insects described in 1894